Hands Off Gretel is a rock band, affiliated to the UK Punk scene, formed 2015 in Barnsley, South Yorkshire. The current line-up is Lauren Tate (guitar, vocals), Sean Bon (guitar) Sam Hobbins (drums) and Becky Baldwin (bass)  The band have achieved press coverage in the Basingstoke Gazette, music magazine Vive Le Rock and website Louder Than War. Their music often explores the themes of loneliness, guilt, and girlhood.

History

The band was formed in 2015, Tate already having released an album as a solo artist.  A preview for a Southampton concert in the Basingstoke Gazette reported "Hands Off Gretel's frontwoman Lauren Tate has made it her mission to ensure that strong young women have a voice in today's music industry." Tate is also credited for the band's videos, album artwork, and designing of the band's merchandise.

In 2016, they released their debut album Burn The Beauty Queen, which received praise from Ged Babey in Louder Than War:  "a massive achievement and over-ambitious album which marks the start of a career that could well see them becoming as big as Nirvana, Marilyn Manson or Miley Cyrus over time….. given the breaks, and skillful management."

Their performance at The Great British Alternative Festival at Butlins in Skegness was reviewed by Vive Le Rock. Reviewer Paula Frost commented on how Tate "entered with yet another iconic look, this time dressed in gold with lines drawn across her face [...] She knows how to get the audience snapping away."

A second album I Want The World was released on 29 March 2019. Vive Le Rock'''s Paula Frost awarded the album 8/10, commenting "It's not often you get a band who can emit intimidation and cuteness all at once."  Later that year, Tate released a new solo album, Songs for Sad Girls.

Discography
Hands Off Gretel
 Studio albums 
 Burn The Beauty Queen (Hands Off Gretel, 2016)
 I Want The World (Puke Pop, 2019)

 Demos Album 
 Bedroom Sessions (Hands Off Gretel, 2016)
 Singles/ EPs 
 Be Mine (Hands Off Gretel, 2015)
 My Size (Hands Off Gretel, 2016)
 The Angry EP (Puke Pop, 2020)

Compilations
 Devolution Issue 41 - Devolution magazine
Lauren Tate solo career
 Studio albums 
 The Bankrupt Sessions (Lauren Tate, 2013)
 Love Songs (Lauren Tate, 2016)
 Songs For Sad Girls (Trash Queen Records, 2019) 

Singles/EPs
 Trapped In My Skin (Lauren Tate, 2014)
 My Reflection (Lauren Tate, 2014)
MP3 singles
 You Know I'm No Good (Lauren Tate, 2017)
 What's Up (Lauren Tate, 2017)
 Dear Mr President (Lauren Tate, 2017)
 Down In A Hole (Tribute To Layne Staley)'' (Lauren Tate, 2017)

References

External links
 Official website

English alternative rock groups
2015 establishments in England
Musical groups established in 2015